The Vancouver Island Regional Library(VIRL) is the fourth-largest library system in British Columbia. It serves more than 430,000 people on Vancouver Island, Haida Gwaii (formerly Queen Charlotte Islands) and the Central Coast (Bella Coola) through 39 branch libraries and a books-by-mail service.  Administrative offices are located in Nanaimo. Vancouver Island Regional Library opened its doors in 1936 as the Vancouver Island Union Library; it was the second regional library in North America.

Services
Vancouver Island Regional Library offers a books-by-mail service. VIRL has a searchable online catalogue.
Information and reference services
Access to full text databases
Community information
Internet access
Reader's advisory services
Programs for children, youth and adults
Delivery to homebound individuals
Interlibrary loan
Free downloadable audiobooks

Branches
With Central Services on Hammond Bay Road in north Nanaimo, VIRL has branches in Bella Coola, Bowser, Campbell River, Chemainus, Comox, Cortes Island, Courtenay, Cowichan, Cowichan Lake, Cumberland, Gabriola Island, Gold River, Hornby Island, Ladysmith, Masset, Nanaimo Harbourfront, Nanaimo North, Nanaimo Wellington, Parksville, Port Alberni, Port Alice, Port Clements, Port Hardy, Port McNeill, Port Renfrew, Quadra Island, Qualicum Beach, Queen Charlotte City, Sandspit, Sayward, Sidney/North Saanich, Sointula, Sooke, South Cowichan, Tahsis, Tofino, Ucluelet, Union Bay and Woss.

References

External links 
 Vancouver Island Regional Library

Public libraries in British Columbia
Libraries established in 1936
1936 establishments in Canada